The articles listed below on specific bodies of water—seas, lakes, rivers, etc. have significant content on the subject of fly fishing for the fish that swim in them or are notable fly fishing destinations in North America.

United States
 Alabama
 Sipsey River - below Smith Lake Dam 
 Alaska
 Chena River - Premier dry-fly fishing for Arctic grayling
 Russian River - Fly fishing only for sockeye and silver salmon
Arizona
 Lee's Ferry - trout
Arkansas
 White River
 Little Red River
 Buffalo River
 Crooked Creek
 North Fork River
 Little Buffalo River

 California
 Kern River
 Pit River
 Colorado
 Animas River
 Arkansas River
 Fryingpan River
 Gunnison River
 North Platte River
 Rio Grande
 Roaring Fork River
 Connecticut
Farmington River
 Florida
 Biscayne Bay
 Florida Keys
 Florida Gulf Coast
Georgia
 Chattahoochee River
 Dukes Creek
 Idaho
 Big Lost River
 Big Wood River
 Boise River
 Clearwater River
 Coeur d'Alene River
 Fall River
 Henrys Fork (Snake River)—Fly fishing only within Harriman State Park
 Lochsa River
 Saint Joe River
 Salmon River
 Selway River
 Silver Creek
 Teton River
 Kentucky
 Cumberland River
 Maine
 Penobscot River - World class landlocked salmon fishery on the West Branch
 Maryland
 Potomac River - North Branch
 Savage River
 Youghiogheny River
 Massachusetts
Deerfield River
Millers River
Swift River
Westfield River
 Michigan
 Au Sable River - Blue Ribbon trout fishery known for trophy brown trout.  Also known as Michigan's "holy waters."
 Huron River - Blue Ribbon smallmouth bass fishery in the Dexter-Ann Arbor area.
 Pere Marquette River - The PM is especially known for its fall run salmon, but it has its share of large trout and steelhead.
 Minnesota (see also :Category:Minnesota trout streams)
 Camp Creek (Trout), (Fillmore County)
 Crooked Creek (Trout), (Houston County)
 Devil Track River
 Hay Creek (Trout), (Goodhue County)
 Mississippi River (Bass)
 Pigeon River
 Pine Creek (Trout), (Fillmore, Winona Counties)
 Root River - North and South Branches (Trout); Middle and South Forks (Trout)
 Rush Creek (Trout), (Fillmore and Winona Counties)
 Snake River (Bass) 
 Vermillion River (Pike, Trout) (Dakota County)
 Whitewater River Main, Middle and South Forks (Trout),  (Olmstead, Winona, Wabasha Counties) 
 Winnebago Creek (Trout), (Houston County)
 Missouri
 Bennett Spring State Park
Capps Creek
Crane Creek - known for the rare opportunity to catch a genetically pure strain of the McCloud Rainbow Trout.
Lake Taneycomo
Maramec Spring Park
Montauk State Park
Niangua River
Roaring River State Park
 Montana
 Big Hole River—A Blue Ribbon trout stream. Catch and release for grayling and westslope cutthroat trout Catch and release for brown trout (Dickey bridge to mouth)
 Beaverhead River - Catch and release for brown trout
 Bitterroot River
 Blackfoot River - A Blue Ribbon trout stream
 Boulder River - A Blue Ribbon trout stream
 Clark Fork
 Dearborn River
 DePuy Spring Creek
 East Gallatin River
 Gallatin River - A Blue Ribbon trout stream
 Glacier National Park - Catch and release fishing for bull trout
 Madison River - A Blue Ribbon trout stream. Headwaters fly fishing only in Yellowstone National Park.
 Missouri River - Canyon Ferry Dam to Cascade, MT
 Ruby River - rainbow and brown trout in lower reaches, cutbow and Arctic grayling in headwaters
 Yellowstone River - A Blue Ribbon trout stream. Headwaters in Wyoming and Yellowstone National Park
 Nevada
 Truckee River
 New Hampshire
 Androscoggin River
 Connecticut River - Fly fishing only above Lake Francis
 New Jersey
 Flat Brook (including tributaries Big Flat Brook and Little Flat Brook)
 Paulins Kill
 Pequest River
 New Mexico
 Cimarron River
 Pecos River
 Rio Grande, Upper
 Rio Chama
 San Juan River
 New York
 Ausable River
 Batten Kill
 Beaver Kill
 Carmans River   special reg trout
 Connetquot River   special reg trout
 East Branch Delaware River
 Esopus Creek
 Neversink River
 Nissequogue River   special reg trout
 New York City Watershed Waters   special reg trout
 Schoharie Creek
 West Branch Delaware River
 Willowemoc Creek
 North Carolina
 Cheoah River
 Davidson River
 French Broad River - upstream of Brevard
 Green River
 Linville River
 Nantahala River
 Pigeon River - upstream of Canton
 Tuckasegee River
 Watauga River
 Ohio
 Mad River
 Clear Fork River
 Clear Fork Mohican River
 Chagrin River
 Rocky River
 Oregon
 Deschutes River
 North Umpqua River
 Pennsylvania
 Big Spring Creek-Cumberland    special reg trout
 Falling Spring Branch    special reg trout
 Fishing Creek
 Jordan Creek
 Lackawaxen River
 LeTort Spring Run - Catch and release fly fishing only
 Little Juniata River
 Little Lehigh Creek    special reg trout
 Ridley Creek State Park
 Yellow Breeches Creek    special reg trout
 Tennessee
 Bald River
 Caney Fork
 Elk River 
 Great Smoky Mountains National Park - Also in North Carolina
 Hiwassee River
 Holston River
 Tellico River
 Watauga River
 Vermont
 Batten Kill
 Virginia
 James River
 New River (Bass, Musky)
 Shenandoah River (Bass)
 Rapidan River
 Shenandoah River (Bass)
 Shenandoah National Park
 Utah
 San Juan River - Also in Colorado and New Mexico
Provo River - World class trout fishery close to Utah's major cities. Brown and rainbow trout reach record lengths, with a typical fish running 18 inches or bigger. There are 3 branches to the Provo River, the lower, middle, and upper.
 Washington
 Yakima River
 West Virginia
 Cheat River
 Lost River
 Mill Run
 Wyoming
 Yellowstone National Park:
 Firehole River - Fly fishing only in Yellowstone National Park
 Gibbon River - Fly fishing only below Gibbon Falls
 Lamar River - Major river in core of Yellowstone cutthroat trout population
 Slough Creek
North Platte River

Canada
Quebec

 Du-Diable River*
 Cache River*
 Doncaster River*
 Du-Nord River*
 Ouareau River*
 Shawinigan River*
 Chateauguay River*
 Yamaska River*
 Nicolet River*,#
 Du-Gouffre River**
 Jacques-Cartier River*
 Momonrency River*
 Malbaie River**
 Etchemin River*
 Kedgwick River**
 Ouelle River**
 Rimouski River**
 A-Mars River**
 Petit-Saguenay River**
 Saint-Jean River**, Saguenay
 Sainte-Marguerite River**
 Aux-Saumon River**
 Aux-Rochers River**
 Des-Escoumins River**
 Godbout River**
 Laval River**
 Moisie River**
 Trinite River**
 Saint-Jean River**, Côte-Nord
 Piashti River**
 Petit-Watshishou River**
 Nabisipi River**
 Nathashquan River**
 Kegaska River**
 Musguaro River**
 Muskanousse River**
 Washicoutai River**
 Gros-Mecatina River**
 Kecarpoui River**
 Coxipi River**
 Saint-Paul River**
 Jupiter River**
 De-la-Chaloupe River**
 Bonaventure River**
 Cap-Chat River**
 Cacapedia River**
 Causapscal River**
 Dartmouth River**
 Grande River**
 Grand-Pabos-Nord River**
 Grand-Pabos-Ouest River**
 Madeleine River**
 Nouvelle River**
 Malbaie River**, Gaspé Peninsula
 Matane River**
 Matapedia River**
 Patapedia River**
 Petit-Cascapedia River**
 Petit-Pabos River**
 Port-Daniel River**
 Restigouche River**
 Sainte-Anne River**
 Saint-Jean River**, Gaspé Peninsula
 York River**

Ontario

Burnt River - smallmouth bass fly fishing river
Credit River
Grand River - brown trout and other species
Nipigon River
Ottawa River
Saugeen River - smallmouth bass and brown trout fly fishing river

New Brunswick

 Miramichi River
 Restigouche River

Notes:   
*Trout  
**Salmon  
#Bass

Further reading

See also
List of fly fishing waters in Europe

Notes

Fly fishing
Recreational fishing-related lists
Water in North America